Marelisa Gibson Villegas (born 26 August 1988) is a Venezuelan designer and beauty pageant titleholder who won Miss Venezuela 2009.

Early life
Gibson was born in Caracas, where she use to  study architecture at the Central University of Venezuela. She speaks Spanish, English and French. Gibson attended the Art Institute of Philadelphia for Interior Design.

Career

Miss Venezuela
Gibson, who stands 1.78 m (5'10"), became the sixth Miss Miranda to win that title since the Miss Venezuela pageant began in 1952. She also won the Best Face award. Miss Venezuela, Marelisa Gibson, did not place in the top 16 at Miss Universe 2010.

References

External links
Miss Venezuela Official Website
Miss Universe Official Website

1988 births
Living people
People from Caracas
Miss Venezuela winners
Miss Universe 2010 contestants
Venezuelan people of Mexican descent
Venezuelan people of Swedish descent
Central University of Venezuela alumni